Wilfried Trott (born 25 July 1948) is a German former cyclist. He competed at the 1972 Summer Olympics and the 1976 Summer Olympics for West Germany.

References

External links
 

1948 births
Living people
German male cyclists
Olympic cyclists of West Germany
Cyclists at the 1972 Summer Olympics
Cyclists at the 1976 Summer Olympics
Sportspeople from Wuppertal
Cyclists from North Rhine-Westphalia